Dressed to Kill is a 1941 crime mystery starring Lloyd Nolan, Mary Beth Hughes and Sheila Ryan. The film is based on The Dead Take No Bows, a mystery novel by Richard Burke.

Plot summary

Private investigator Michael Shayne and his singer fiancée Joanne La Marr hear a woman screaming from a room in their hotel. The hotel maid Emily has discovered two dead people: producer Louis Lathrop, owner of the hotel and the adjoining theater, and Desiree Vance, one of Lathrop's actresses. Both are dressed in medieval costumes, and Lathrop is wearing the head from a dog costume.

Police investigator Pierson arrives at the scene and learns from hotel manager Hal Brennon that the costumes are from Lathrop's only successful show, Sweethearts of Paris, from many years earlier. Desiree had been the show's leading lady, and Carlo Ralph played Beppo the Dog. Shayne suspects Carlo because of the dog-costume head on Lathrop.

David Earle, also an actor in Lathrop's show, tells the police that Lathrop had hosted a private party for the entire cast to celebrate its anniversary. Shayne examines the list of those involved in the production and discovers that the musical director was Max Allaron, an alcoholic who also lives at the hotel.

As the investigation proceeds, Shayne learns that Lathrop kept another woman in addition to Desiree and that the apartment has many entrances and exits. From Earle's daughter he also learns that cast member Julian Davis stole money from Lathrop, so he visits Davis and finds him with Phyllis Lathrop, Louis' wife. They confess to embezzling money from Louis but claim to be innocent of his murder. They hire Shayne to help them prove their innocence.

Shayne continues his investigation and talks to Allaron. He learns that Carlo died in World War I in France but then discovers a letter from Carlo in Desiree's room that proves that Carlo is still alive.

Shayne brings Davis to the Lathrop apartment and they discover a hidden passage to the maid Emily's room downstairs. They find Emily's dead body and a note explaining that she had killed Lathrop because he had betrayed her years earlier for another woman. Emily was once known as actress Lynn Evans.

Shayne does not believe that Emily has killed herself, so he continues searching for the real killer. When Shayne is back in Lathrop's apartment, Pierson is knocked unconscious in the next room by Allaron. Otto Kahn, the theater doorman, arrives and confesses that killed Lathrop and Desiree. He is really Carlo, and was married to Desiree before she had left him for Lathrop. He also killed Emily because she had discovered too much about him. Allaron has been blackmailing Carlo, whom he witnessed leaving the apartment right after the killings. While they are talking, Pierson regains consciousness, and together with Shayne, he overpowers Otto and Allaron.

Shayne asks Pierson to be his best man at the wedding later in the day, but Shayne then learns that Joanne has eloped with her ex-boyfriend because she grew tired of waiting for Shayne.

Cast

Lloyd Nolan as Michael Shayne
Mary Beth Hughes as Joanne La Marr
Sheila Ryan as Connie Earle
William Demarest as Inspector Pierson
Mantan Moreland as Rusty (misidentified in the end credits as "Sam")
Virginia Brissac as Lynne Evans, aka Emily, the maid
Erwin Kalser as Otto Kahn/Carlo Ralph
Henry Daniell as Julian Davis
Dick Rich as Al
Milton Parsons as Max Allaron
Charles Arnt as Hal Brennon
Charles Trowbridge as David Earle
Hamilton MacFadden as Reporter
May Beatty as Phyllis Lathrop
Charles Wilson as Editor
Ben Carter as Sam (misidentified in the end credits as "Rusty")

Production
Dressed to Kill was the third in a series of Michael Shayne detective films. The first seven were produced by 20th Century Fox and starred Lloyd Nolan. The final five were produced by Producers Releasing Corporation (PRC) and starred Hugh Beaumont. There were also three radio shows (1944–1953) and a television series (1960–1961) based on the Shayne character.

Reception

Upon the film's release on DVD in 2005, DVD Talk said: "At just 74 minutes Dressed to Kill is innocuous fun, though like most of Fox's mysteries from the period it leans heavily on the charm of its actors rather than the ingenuity of its writing."

Hal Erickson of Allmovie wrote that the film "benefits from a powerhouse supporting cast and the effectively moody cinematography of Glenn MacWilliams."

External links

References

1941 films
American black-and-white films
Film noir
Films based on American novels
Films based on mystery novels
1941 mystery films
20th Century Fox films
1941 crime films
Films directed by Eugene Forde
Films produced by Sol M. Wurtzel
Films scored by Cyril J. Mockridge
American crime films
American mystery films
1940s American films
1940s English-language films